Camden County Courthouse may refer to:

Camden County Courthouse (Georgia), Woodbine, Georgia
Camden County Courthouse (North Carolina), Camden, North Carolina
Camden County Hall of Justice, Camden, New Jersey